Ada Margarita Álvarez Socarrás is a Cuban operations researcher whose research interests include metaheuristics for scheduling and transportation planning. She is a professor and researcher in Mexico, in the Faculty of Mechanical and Electrical Engineering of the Autonomous University of Nuevo León.

Education and career
Álvarez earned a degree in mathematics from the University of Havana in 1982, and completed a PhD at the Central University of Las Villas in Cuba, in 1993.

She joined the Autonomous University of Nuevo León in 1995.

Recognition
Álvarez is a member of the Mexican Academy of Sciences.

References

External links

Year of birth missing (living people)
Living people
Cuban engineers
Women engineers
Operations researchers
Cuban women scientists
Cuban emigrants to Mexico
University of Havana alumni
University "Marta Abreu" of Las Villas alumni
Academic staff of the Autonomous University of Nuevo León
Members of the Mexican Academy of Sciences